Pichaet Wiriyachitra (ศ.ดร.พิ เชษฐ์ วิริยะจิตรา) is a former professor of chemistry at Prince of Songkla University. He has specialized in the  development of pharmaceuticals from natural products, particularly  Xanthone from Mangosteen.  He is also Chairman and CEO of Asian Phytoceuticals Public Co., Ltd.

Biography
Wiriyachitra was born 27 July 1944 in Bangkok. He attended Suankularb Wittayalai School and Triam Udom Suksa School, and received a B.Sc, Hons., from the University of Western Australia, and a Ph.D, Organic Chemistry from the University of Tasmania. He followed this with Post-doctoral Fellowships at the University of Connecticut and  University of Pennsylvania. Subsequently he held the posts of Lecturer, Assistant Professor, Associate Professor, and  Professor of Chemistry at Prince of Songkla University, also becoming the Vice President and Dean of Graduate School. He has been a Guest Scientist at the  Japan Society for the Promotion of Science and the  German Cancer Research Center.

In 1988 he founded the Natural Cosmetic Research Company, which changed its name to Asian Phytoceuticals Public Co., Ltd. in 2005.

Mangosteen research 

He leads a scientific team at the Mangosteen Research and Development Center (Thailand) called Operation BIM who have been doing research since 1977.

References 

1944 births
Pichaet Wiriyachitra
University of Western Australia alumni
University of Tasmania alumni
Living people
Pichaet Wiriyachitra